Avinash Chandra (28 August 1931 – 15 September 1991) was an Indian painter, who lived and worked in the United Kingdom.

He was born on 28 August 1931 in Shimla, India, and was brought up there and in Delhi. His father was the manager of the Cecil hotel in Delhi.  He attended, and later taught at, Delhi Polytechnic. His students include Paramjit Singh, Arpita Singh and Gopi Gajwani. His 1955 "Snow in Pahalgam" sold for INR 4,375,000.

He moved, with his wife, to Golders Green, London, in 1956.

In 1962 he was featured in a BBC Monitor documentary, presented by W.G. Archer, and in 2018 in the BBC documentary Whoever Heard of a Black Artist?.

He died in London on 15 September 1991.

Awards and recognition 

Chandra won first prize at the First National Art Exhibition of Art, in New Delhi, in 1954. and the gold medal  in 1962.

A solo exhibition was held at the Hamilton Galleries in London in 1965. His work was also exhibited as part of The Other Story: Afro-Asian artists in post-war Britain at the Hayward Gallery in 1989; and is in collections including those of the Arts Council of Great Britain, Ashmolean Museum, Kettle's Yard, Durham University, Leicestershire County Council, Museum of Modern Art (Berlin), Museum of Modern Art (Haifa), National Gallery of Modern Art, the National Trust for England, New York University, Punjab Museum, Tate, and the Victoria and Albert Museum.

Solo exhibitions
1987 Avinash Chandra, Horizon Gallery, London.

Group exhibitions 
1987 The Other Story, Hayward Gallery, London.

Reviews, articles, texts, etc.

- Rasheed Araeen, 'Conversation with Avinash Chandra', Third Text, no.3/4, (Spring - Summer 1988), 69–95.

- 'Avinash Chandra', Third Text, no.16/17, (Autumn - Winter), 3–4.

- James Burr, 'Obituary', Apollo, no.135, (January 1992), 54.

References

Further reading 

 
 
 

1931 births
1991 deaths
20th-century Indian painters
People from Shimla
20th-century British painters
People from Golders Green
Delhi Technological University alumni
Indian emigrants to the United Kingdom